Grey Crow is a studio album by American hip hop musician Eligh. It was released by Legendary Music on November 9, 2010. It peaked at number 75 on the Billboard Top R&B/Hip-Hop Albums chart, as well as number 47 on the Heatseekers Albums chart.

Track listing

Charts

References

External links
 
 

2010 albums
Eligh albums